Stuart Building may refer to:

in the United States (by state)
Stuart Company Plant and Office Building, Pasadena, California, listed on the National Register of Historic Places in Pasadena, California
Stuart Building (Louisville, Kentucky), listed on the National Register of Historic Places in Jefferson County, Kentucky
Stuart Building (Lincoln, Nebraska), listed on the National Register of Historic Places in Lancaster County, Nebraska